Experience Project was a free social networking website consisting of various online communities. It operated from 2007 until 2016, when it announced it would suspend registrations and enter a read-only mode for an indefinite period.

Members submitted "experiences"—their personal, first-person stories about various life experiences they had. Users could then form or join communities based on these experiences and/or interests, and interact with other members who shared them. As of May 2016, the site had over sixty-seven million of these "experiences".

In March 2016, Experience Project announced that it would suspend operations indefinitely. The existing content of the site would remain publicly available, but members would no longer be able to post new content or access their accounts. The site was officially suspended on April 21, 2016.

As of March 2018 all links to the website redirected to a new page which contained only a short message on a blank white background informing that the website is "taking a break" and thanking the community of the site. As of February 2023, the website is still closed.

Description
The nodes of the network were "life experiences", such as starting a new job, battling depression or surviving a divorce. Members who had listed experiences in common were automatically connected. Reversing the "f.r.i.e.n.d.s." concept of traditional social networks, in which connections are made between known individuals who then may or may not share experiences, on the Experience Project, connections were made based on shared experiences. The site emphasized anonymity to promote more authentic conversations that would otherwise be quelled by fear of recognition or embarrassment.

In March 2016, it was announced that Experience Project would be closing for the long term on April 21, 2016. New registrations or the posting of new content was suspended, freezing the current library of experiences. Reasons cited for the closure included difficulties maintaining user privacy in the face of increasing governmental powers, challenges complying with new data privacy laws, and general online trends that were moving away from long-form content.

Leadership 

Armen Berjikly was founder and CEO of the community, with executive leadership including Neil Sheth as CTO, and Erik Darby as SVP.

Origins 

Experience Project was started by Armen Berjikly in late 2004. In 2013, Berjikly gave a popular TEDx talk that told the origin story of the site. After a close friend's diagnosis with multiple sclerosis Berjikly created This is MS, an online community for MS patients and caregivers focused on inspiring hope in patients through knowledge of current research. As This is MS grew, Berjikly identified that the key benefit to patients was not the editorialized content, but the relationships that formed between people who understood each other through the shared experience of having multiple sclerosis. Experience Project extended the ability to connect with people who understood each other and had similar experiences.

Notes

External links 
Experience Project (from the Internet Archive)

Companies based in San Francisco
Defunct social networking services